Tel Haror (Hebrew name) or Tell Abu Hureyra (Arabic name; also spelled Hureira and Hareira), also known as Tel Heror, is an archaeological site in the western Negev Desert, Israel, northwest of Beersheba, about 20 km east of the Mediterranean Sea, situated on the north bank of Wadi Gerar, a wadi known in Arabic as Wadi esh-Sheri'a. During the Middle Bronze Age II it was one of the largest urban centres in the area, occupying about 40 acres. The city contains substantial remains of Middle Bronze Age II through to Persian-period settlement strata.

Excavations

W.F. Albright suggested as early as 1924 that there was a Cushite colony here founded in the tenth century BCE.

In 1956 Yohanan Aharoni identified biblical Gerar with the site of Tell Abu Hureira (Tel Haror).

Tel Haror was excavated by Eliezer Oren of the Ben Gurion University of the Negev between 1982 and 1992. In 2010, there were also further explorations by Oren with P. Nahshoni and G. Bar-Oz.

Substantial remains of Middle Bronze to late Iron Age settlement strata were uncovered.

History

Middle Bronze II city

Fortifications
The extensive MBIII fortified city of Tel Haror was enclosed by an elaborate system of earthen ramparts fronted by a deep ditch.

Migdol temple
Within the city a sacred precinct was excavated, including a migdol temple that contained numerous remains of animal sacrifice, as well as cultic pottery, some of it imported. Numerous ritual deposits (favissae) were found. The migdol temple had external dimensions of 9×15 m with massive walls that may have originally been as high as 10m. Within the fortifications, there is a well, more than 10m deep.

A Minoan graffito was found in the sacred precinct dating to ca. 1600 BCE. Analyses of the sherd determined that it originated in Crete, most likely the south coast. The three signs were inscribed prior to firing. The signs may either represent Linear A writing, or the Cretan hieroglyphs.

Identification with ancient cities
Archaeologist Anson Rainey proposed Tel Haror as the site of the fortress of Sharuhen, known from ancient Egyptian sources. This identification is also supported by Donald Redford, because of the site's immense size and important geographical position.

Tel Haror is also widely accepted as the site of ancient Gerar, an identification for which it competes with the other three large tells between Gaza and Beersheba, Tell Jemmeh, Tell esh-Sharia (see Tel Sera at Hebrew-language Wikipedia:) and Tell et-Tuwail (also spelled Tell et-Tuwaiyil; by the Byzantine site of Be'er Osnat, near Kibbutz Tze'elim).

This was one of the cities of the Philistines. Philistine pottery was found on the site.

See also
Ziklag
Tall al-Ajjul

Notes

Bibliography
Day, Peter M., et al. 1999 Petrographic Analysis of the Tel Haror Inscribed Sherd: Seeking Provenance Within Crete. Aegaeum 20: 191–96.
E.D. OREN, "The 'kingdom of Sharuhen' and the Hyksos kingdom," in E.D. OREN (ed.), The Hyksos: new historical and archaeological perspectives (1997) 253-283
Oren, Eliezer D., et al. 1996 A Minoan Graffito from Tel Haror (Negev, Israel). Cretan Studies 5: 91–118.
E.D. OREN, "Tel Haror," in E. STERN (ed.), The New Encyclopedia of archaeological excavations in the Holy Land (1993) 580-584

External links
Prof. Eliezer Oren site at academia.edu

Bronze Age sites in Israel
Philistine cities
Archaeology of the Near East